Antonio Signori Nymi Dominique (born 25 July 1994) is a professional footballer who plays as a goalkeeper.

Born in Switzerland, António represents Angola at international level.

Career
Born in Lausanne, Switzerland, Dominique has played club football for Lausanne-Sport II, Lausanne-Sport, FC Le Mont, Primeiro de Agosto, FC Basel II, FC Basel and Petro de Luanda.

He made his international debut for Angola in 2014.

References

1994 births
Living people
Sportspeople from Lausanne
Swiss people of Angolan descent
Swiss sportspeople of African descent
Swiss men's footballers
Angolan footballers
Angola international footballers
FC Lausanne-Sport players
FC Le Mont players
C.D. Primeiro de Agosto players
FC Basel players
Swiss Super League players
Swiss Challenge League players
Girabola players
Association football goalkeepers
Atlético Petróleos de Luanda players
Angola A' international footballers
2016 African Nations Championship players